Jia Delong (born 4 July 1985) is a Chinese baseball player who was a member of Team China at the 2008 Summer Olympics.

Sports career
2002 Guangdong Provincial Team;
2006 National Team

Major performances
2005 National Games - 5th;
2006/2007 National League - 2nd;
2006 National Championship - 4th

References
Profile 2008 Olympics Team China

1985 births
Living people
Chinese baseball players
Baseball players at the 2008 Summer Olympics
Olympic baseball players of China
2009 World Baseball Classic players
Sportspeople from Dalian
2013 World Baseball Classic players
Baseball players at the 2010 Asian Games
Asian Games competitors for China